Philip of Ibelin may refer to:

 Philip of Ibelin (1180–1227), nobleman of the Kingdom of Cyprus
Philip of Ibelin (died 1304)
 Philip of Ibelin (died 1318), Seneschal of the Kingdom of Cyprus